Yasuo Kawamura (7 May 1908 – 13 October 1997) was a Japanese speed skater who competed in the 1932 and 1936 Winter Olympics.

In 1932 he participated in the 500 metres competition, in the 1500 metres event, in the 5000 metres competition, and in the 10000 metres event, but was eliminated in the heats in all four contests.

Four years later he finished 28th in the 1500 metres competition.

Early life 
Kawamura was born in Ogoto, Ōtsu, Shiga before moving to Korea and eventually Manchuria with his family. Here, he started speed skating.

Death 
Kawamure died on 13 October 1997 in Sapporo, Hokkaido.

Best times 

 500m – 45.8 (1936)
 1500m – 2:28.2 (1936)
 5000m – 9:22.6 (1932)
 10000m – 19:52.5 (1935)

References

External links
 Speed skating 1932+1936 
 

1908 births
1997 deaths
Japanese male speed skaters
Speed skaters at the 1932 Winter Olympics
Speed skaters at the 1936 Winter Olympics
Olympic speed skaters of Japan
Sportspeople from Shiga Prefecture
20th-century Japanese people